Dunas de Mira, Gândara e Gafanhas, is a Natura 2000 Site of Community Importance (code: PTCON0055) in Portugal. It is located in the Centro region, in the districts of Aveiro, and Coimbra.

Geography
Dunas de Mira, Gândara e Gafanhas covers the dune system between Vagos and the Cape Mondego, in the municipalities of Vagos, Mira, Cantanhede, and Figueira da Foz. The protected area includes an area of 205.11 km2.

Flora 

Vegetation within this protected area is dominated by plants adapted to coastal habitats, including Ammophila arenaria and Pinus pinaster. In the cliffs of Cape Mondego, Portuguese endemic species like Armeria welwitschii can be found.
The area is also under threat by invasive species, including several Australian Acacia species, Carpobrotus edulis, Cortaderia selloana, and Myriophyllum aquaticum.

References

External links
 

Centro Region, Portugal
Geography of Aveiro District
Geography of Coimbra District
Geography of Vila Real District
Natura 2000 in Portugal